Pietrzykowski (feminine: Pietrzykowska, plural: Pietrzykowscy) is a Polish surname, and may refer to:

 David Pietrzykowski, Center Rock CEO
 Jennie Marie Pietrzykowski, mother of Janice Dickinson
 Tad Pietrzykowski, Cyclone! comic artist
 Tadeusz Pietrzykowski (1917–1991), Polish boxer, Polish Armed Forces soldier, and a prisoner at the Auschwitz-Birkenau and Neuengamme concentration camps
 Tomacz Pietrzykowski, Dean of the School of Computer Science at Acadia University
 Zbigniew Pietrzykowski (1934–2014), Polish boxer, lost to Muhammad Ali in 1960 Olympic final

Polish-language surnames